The BL 4-inch Mk IX naval gun was a British medium-velocity naval gun introduced in 1917 as secondary armament on the  battlecruisers and  "large light cruisers", but which served most notably as the main armament on s throughout World War II.

History

World War I 

The gun was based on the barrel of the QF 4-inch Mk V and the breech mechanism of the BL 4-inch Mk VIII and was first introduced in World War I on capital ships as secondary armament in triple-gun mountings, intended to provide rapid concentrated fire. This turned out to be unworkable in practice. Jane's Fighting Ships of 1919 commented, "4-inch triples are clumsy and not liked. They are not mounted in one sleeve; have separate breech mechanism, a gun crew of 23 to each triple". Guns were thereafter used in single-gun mountings, typically on smaller ships as the main armament.

World War II 

In World War II the gun was employed on many small warships such as s and minesweepers, primarily for action against surfaced submarines.

This was the last BL 4 inch gun in British service: all subsequent guns have used charges in metal cartridges "QF".  It was succeeded on new small warships built in World War II by the QF 4-inch Mk XIX gun which fired a slightly heavier shell at much lower velocity and had a high-angle mounting which added anti-aircraft capability.

Surviving examples 
 On board , the last surviving , at Halifax, Nova Scotia, Canada
 A gun at the entrance to the marina in Hull, UK
 A gun at Port Isaac, Cornwall, UK
 Leith Harbour In South Georgia

See also 
 List of naval guns

Notes

References

Bibliography 
 Tony DiGiulian, British 4"/45 (10.2 cm) BL Marks IX and X

External links 

Naval guns of the United Kingdom
World War I naval weapons of the United Kingdom
World War II naval weapons of the United Kingdom
100 mm artillery